"Bonnie and Clyde" is a French-language song written by Serge Gainsbourg, and performed by Gainsbourg and Brigitte Bardot. The song tells the story of the outlaw couple Bonnie and Clyde. It is based on an English language poem written by Bonnie Parker herself a few weeks before she and Clyde Barrow were shot, entitled "The Trail's End". It was released on two albums in 1968: Gainsbourg's album Initials B.B., and Gainsbourg and Bardot's album Bonnie and Clyde.

In popular culture

Appearances in media
 The song is featured in the film Irma Vep (1996).
 The song is featured in a 1997 episode of Blue Jam, Season 1, Episode 1.
 The song is featured in the film Laurel Canyon (2002).
 The song is featured in the film Rush Hour 3 (2007).
 The song is featured in a 2013 episode of Mad Men, Season 6, Episode 4, "To Have and To Hold".
 The song is featured in a 2016 episode of Jean-Claude Van Johnson, Season 1, Episode 5, "Run to Nowhere".
 The song is featured in a commercial for the 2017 Nissan Micra titled Meet the Accomplice (2017).
 The song is featured in the film A Simple Favor (2018).
 The song is featured in the web television series The Act (2019).

Cover versions
 Steve Wynn (with Johnette Napolitano) covered it in English for Wynn's album Dazzling Display (1992).
 Luna (with Lætitia Sadier of Stereolab on vocals) covered it for Luna's album Penthouse (1995). The song was later released as a single subtitled "the Clyde Barrow version" with a slower version subtitled "the Bonnie Parker version".
 Mick Harvey covered it in English for the Gainsbourg tribute album Intoxicated Man (1995).
 James Iha of The Smashing Pumpkins (with Kazu Makino of Blonde Redhead) covered it as "The Ballad of Bonnie and Clyde" for the American edition of the tribute album Monsieur Gainsbourg Revisited (2006).
 Belinda Carlisle covered it in French for her album Voila (2007) and in English, included on a bonus disc.
 Giddle & Boyd (Giddle Partridge and Boyd Rice) covered it for their EP Going Steady with Peggy Moffitt (2008).
 Lulu Gainsbourg, Serge Gainsbourg's son recorded a cover (with Scarlett Johansson) for the Lulu Gainsbourg album From Gainsbourg to Lulu (2011).
 Freedom Fry covered it for their EP Outlaws (2012).
 Great Northern covered it for a 2012 episode of Gossip Girl, Season 6, Episode 10, "New York, I Love You XOXO."
 Madison covered it for the miniseries Bonnie & Clyde (2013).
 Nick Kroll covered it (with some name changes) for Season 4 of the animated comedy Big Mouth in (2020).

Samples
 MC Solaar sampled it for the song "Nouveau Western" on his second studio album Prose Combat (1994).
 Renegade Soundwave sampled it for their song "Renegade Soundwave" off their album Howyoudoin? (1994).
 United Future Organization sampled it for their song "Good Luck Shore" on their album Bon Voyage (1999).
 7L & Esoteric sampled it for their song "Everywhere" on their album A New Dope (2006).
 Kylie Minogue sampled it for her song "Sensitized" on her album X (2007).
 Jay Electronica sampled it for his song of the same name on his then-unreleased album Act II: The Patents of Nobility (The Turn), which leaked in its entirety on October 4, 2020 and was later officially released the next day.

Remixes
 Matthew Herbert remixed the song subtitled "Herbert's Fred & Ginger Mix" for the tribute album I Love Serge (2001). The remix would also appear on the Zero 7 album Another Late Night: Zero 7 (2002).

References

French-language songs
1968 songs
Serge Gainsbourg songs
Songs written by Serge Gainsbourg
Songs based on poems
Male–female vocal duets
Songs about Bonnie and Clyde
Brigitte Bardot songs